Jenista Joakim Mhagama (born 23 June 1967) is a Tanzanian politician belonging to the Chama Cha Mapinduzi party. She is a Member of Parliament for Peramiho constituency. In December 2015, she was appointed as a Minister of State in the Prime Minister's Office responsible for Policy, Parliamentary Affairs, Labour, Employment, Youth and the Disabled in President John Magufuli's administration. In January 2022, she was moved to the President’s Office Good Governance and Public Services.

Background and education
Mhagama was born on June 23, 1967. She completed her schooling from Peramiho Girls' Secondary School in 1986. In 1989, she received her Diploma in Education from the Korogwe Teachers Training College. She worked as a teacher for six years between 1991 and 1997.

Political career
Mhagama first became involved with CCM in 1987 and served in a variety of roles including in the youth and women wings of the party. She was first appointed to the Parliament from a special seat reserved for women in 2000.

In 2005, she defeated former Finance Minister Simon Mbilinyi in a primary for the right to represent CCM in the upcoming elections for Peramiho constituency. An analysis found that Mhagama was the second most active MP in the 2005-2010 Parliament in terms of contributions to debates and questions to ministers.

Mhagama was the Deputy Minister for Education and Vocational Training in President Jakaya Kikwete's administration between January 2014 and January 2015. Then in a cabinet reshuffle, she was promoted and named Minister of State in the Prime Minister's Office (Policy, coordination and parliamentary affairs).

In the 2015 general elections, Mhagama won her Peramiho seat against CHADEMA candidate Erasmo Mwingira by a vote margin of 32,057 votes to 11,462. In the new President John Magufuli's cabinet, she was appointed a Minister in the Prime Minister’s Office (Labour, Employment, Youth and People with Physical Disabilities). In January 2022, she was moved to the President’s Office Good Governance and Public Services.

References

1967 births
Living people
Chama Cha Mapinduzi MPs
Tanzanian schoolteachers
Deputy government ministers of Tanzania
Tanzanian MPs 2000–2005
Tanzanian MPs 2005–2010
Tanzanian MPs 2010–2015
Tanzanian MPs 2015–2020
Tanzanian MPs 2020–2025
Peramiho Girls Secondary School alumni
Tanzanian Roman Catholics